Deportivo Recoleta, or simply known as Recoleta, is a Paraguayan association football club from the neighbourhood of the same name, in Asunción; founded in 1931. After winning the 2022 Primera B Metropolitana championship, in the 2023 season the team will play in the División Intermedia, which is equivalent to the second division of the Paraguayan league system.

History
In 2015, both Deportivo Recoleta and Sportivo Ameliano gained promotion from the Primera División C to the Primera División B for the 2016 season.

Notable players
To appear in this section a player must have either:
 Played at least 125 games for the club.
 Set a club record or won an individual award while at the club.
 Been part of a national team at any time.
 Played in the first division of any other football association (outside of Paraguay).
 Played in a continental and/or intercontinental competition.

 2000's
 Aureliano Torres (2002–2003)
  Osvaldo Mendoza (2003)
 2010's
 Roberto Acuña (2015, 2016–)
 Derlis Ortiz

Non-CONMEBOL players
 Tobie Mimboe (1993)

Honours
Paraguayan Second Division: 1
2001

Paraguayan Third Division: 2
1971, 2022

References

External links
 Albigol: Deportivo Recoleta Info

Recoleta
Recoleta
Recoleta
1931 establishments in Paraguay